Renata Shakirova is a ballet dancer, currently a first soloist with the Mariinsky Ballet.

Early life and education
Shakirova as born in Tashkent, Uzbekistan. She began her studies at the Bashkir Choreographic College, but then moved to Saint Petersburg with her family when she was admitted to the Vaganova Academy of Russian Ballet and graduated in 2015; her teacher at the Academy was Tatiana Udalenkova.
As a student in the Academy, Renata was given the opportunity to dance roles with the Mariinsky Ballet. She began rehearsing with the Mariinsky dancers as a way to stay in shape during the summer vacation from school and it was during those rehearsals she was asked to dance her first role in the theatre: Cupid in Don Quixote.

Career
Renata joined the Mariinsky Ballet upon her graduation and on October 11, 2015 she made her first principal role debut as Kitri in Don Quixote. She was listed among 25 to Watch by Dance Magazine in 2015.
In 2016 Renata competed in the Bolshoi Ballet Competition hosted by Russian television network Russia-K with Mariinsky principal dancer Kimin Kim and won first prize.

Repertoire
Renata has danced ballets choreographed by Marius Petipa, Yury Grigorovich, Alexei Ratmansky, Michel Fokine, George Balanchine, etc.

Marius Petipa
Giselle (Giselle, Classical Duet)
The Sleeping Beauty (Aurora, Princess Florine)
Swan Lake (Friends of the Prince, Cygnets, Two Swans)
La Bayadère (Nikiya, Trio of Shades)
Raymonda (Henrietta, Grand pas variation)
Le Corsaire (Gulnare, Trio of Odalisques)
Don Quixote (Kitri, Amour, Flower Girls, Grand pas variation)

Yuri Grigorovich
A Legend of Love (Shyrin, Gold Dance)
The Stone Flower (Katarina)

Alexei Ratmansky
Concerto DSCH
The Little Humpbacked Horse (Tsar Maiden)
Cinderella (Cinderella)
Pierrot Lunaire

George Balanchine
Jewels (Rubies soloist)
Apollo (Polyhymnia, Calliope)
A Midsummer Night's Dream (pas de deux in Act II )
Symphony in C (III. Allegro vivace, IV.Allegro vivace)
Swan Lake

Other Choreographers
Romeo and Juliet (Juliet, Juliet's Companions); choreography by Leonid Lavrovsky
Paquita (Carducha); production by Yuri Smekalov
Diana and Acteon Pas de Deux; choreography by Agrippina VaganovaLe Carnaval (Butterfly); choreography by Michel FokineThe Nutcracker (Masha); choreography by Vasili VainonenShurale (Syuimbike); choreography by Leonid YakobsonAdagio Hammerklavier; choreography by Hans van ManenBambi (Butterfly) and Violin Concerto No. 2; choreography by Anton PimonovThe Bronze Horseman (Parasha); choreography by Yuri SmekalovPulcinella'' (Pimpinella); choreography by Ilya Zhivoi

References

Year of birth missing (living people)
Living people
Mariinsky Ballet dancers
Dancers from Tashkent
Vaganova graduates
21st-century ballet dancers